This is a list of Colombian musicians.

Opera singers
Juan Carlos Echeverry, tenor

Producers
Kike Santander, producer

Singers and musicians

Carlos Vives, actor, composer and singer
Joe Arroyo, musician and singer
Andrés Cabas, pop singer
Rafael Orozco, singer
Ryan Cabrera, singer
Andrea Echeverri, singer
Fonseca, singer
Esther Forero (1919–2011), singer and composer
Juanes, singer
Juan Garcia-Herreros electric bassist
Ericson Alexander Molano, gospel singer
Totó la Momposina, singer
Lucía Pulido, singer
Shakira, singer
Soraya, singer
Ryan Starr, singer
Jorge Villamizar, singer
Charlie Zaa, singer
Fanny Lú, singer
Alex Campos, singer
José Barros, singer
Lucas Arnau, singer
Veronica Orozco singer
Andrés Cepeda, singer
Dario Gomez, singer
Rafael Escalona, singer, accordion player
Rafael Godoy, composer
Marbelle, singer
Kaleth Morales, singer
Jorge Celedon, singer
Emiliano Zuleta, singer
Silvestre Dangond singer
Maía, singer
Naty Botero, singer
Diomedes Diaz, singer
Kali Uchis, singer
J Balvin, singer, composer
Maluma, singer, composer
Sebastian Yatra, singer, composer
Karol G, singer, composer
Lizandro Meza, singer
Camilo Echeverry, singer

See also
List of Colombian artists
List of Colombian writers

Colombian musicians
Lists of musicians by nationality